New Hampshire Route 156 (NH 156) is a  secondary north–south highway in Rockingham County in southeastern New Hampshire. The road runs from Raymond to Nottingham.

The southern terminus of NH 156 is at New Hampshire Route 27 and New Hampshire Route 107 on the east side of Raymond. The northern terminus is in Nottingham at NH 152.

Route description
NH 156 begins at an intersection with NH 27 and NH 107 in Raymond, located near the exit 5 interchange of NH 101. The short highway travels north in a generally northeastern direction. It passes by two cemeteries and Pawtuckaway Lake before reaching its northern terminus at an intersection with NH 152 in Nottingham.

Major intersections

References

External links

 New Hampshire State Route 156 on Flickr

156
Transportation in Rockingham County, New Hampshire